Mesa County is a county located in the U.S. state of Colorado. As of the 2020 census, the population was 155,703. The county seat and most populous municipality is Grand Junction. The county was named for the many large mesas in the area, including Grand Mesa.

Mesa County comprises the Grand Junction, CO Metropolitan Statistical Area. In 2020 it ranked as the 271st most populous metropolitan area in the United States. It is the only metropolitan area in Colorado not located on the Front Range.

Geography
It is the fourth-largest county by area in Colorado.

Adjacent counties
 Garfield County – north
 Pitkin County – east
 Gunnison County – east
 Delta County – southeast
 Montrose County – south
 Grand County, Utah – west

Major highways
  Interstate 70
 
 
  U.S. Highway 6
  U.S. Highway 50
  State Highway 65
  State Highway 139
  State Highway 141
  State Highway 330
  State Highway 340
 45 1/2 Rd

National protected areas

Black Ridge Canyons Wilderness
Colorado National Monument
Dominguez Canyon Wilderness
Dominguez-Escalante National Conservation Area (part)
Grand Mesa National Forest
Manti-La Sal National Forest
McInnis Canyons National Conservation Area (part)
Uncompahgre National Forest
White River National Forest

State protected areas
Highline Lake State Park
James M. Robb – Colorado River State Park
Vega State Park

Trails and byways
American Discovery Trail
Dinosaur Diamond Prehistoric Highway National Scenic Byway
Grand Mesa National Scenic and Historic Byway
Kokopelli Trail
Old Spanish National Historic Trail
Unaweep/Tabeguache Scenic and Historic Byway
Colorado Riverfront Trail

Demographics

As of the census of 2010, there were 146,723 people, 58,095 households, and 38,593 families living in the county.  The population density was 44.1 people per square mile (17.23.1/km2).  There were 62,644 housing units.  Information that follows comes from the 2000 American Factfinder data: The racial makeup of the county was 92.34% White, 0.46% Black or African American, 0.91% Native American, 0.53% Asian, 0.10% Pacific Islander, 3.67% from other races, and 1.99% from two or more races.  10.02% of the population were Hispanic or Latino of any race.

There were 45,823 households, out of which 31.40% had children under the age of 18 living with them, 55.30% were married couples living together, 9.80% had a female householder with no husband present, and 31.10% were non-families. 25.10% of all households were made up of individuals, and 10.30% had someone living alone who was 65 years of age or older.  The average household size was 2.47 and the average family size was 2.94.

In the county, the population was spread out, with 25.00% under the age of 18, 9.40% from 18 to 24, 26.70% from 25 to 44, 23.70% from 45 to 64, and 15.20% who were 65 years of age or older.  The median age was 38 years. For every 100 females there were 96.00 males.  For every 100 females age 18 and over, there were 93.20 males.

The median income for a household in the county was $35,864, and the median income for a family was $43,009. Males had a median income of $32,316 versus $22,374 for females. The per capita income for the county was $18,715.  About 7.00% of families and 10.20% of the population were below the poverty line, including 11.50% of those under age 18 and 8.10% of those age 65 or over.

Politics
Unlike most urban counties, Mesa County is strongly Republican. It has voted Democratic only once since 1952, during Lyndon Johnson’s 1964 landslide, and Hubert Humphrey in the following 1968 election is the last Democrat to tally forty percent of the county’s vote.

2020-2021 alleged county clerk election tampering

It was reported in August 2021 that the Mesa County Clerk Tina Peters in May 2021 allowed an unauthorized person into a secure facility during an annual upgrade to the county's election equipment software, compromising the equipment. The security breach meant Mesa County would not be able to use the equipment for its fall 2021 election.

This was not the first time Peters had been a source of election controversy.  In February 2020, it was discovered that Peters' office neglected to count 574 ballots cast in a dropbox outside her office. These uncounted ballots were cast in the November 2019 election and remained uncounted in the dropbox for 3 months.  They were found only because Peters' office checked the dropbox for ballots cast in the next election - the 2020 presidential primary.  This prompted an attempt to recall Peters as county clerk. The effort was unsuccessful.

In March 2022, Peters was indicted by a Mesa County grand jury on seven felony and three misdemeanor counts of election tampering and misconduct related to the alleged May 2021 security breach. Her deputy, Belinda Knisley, was charged on six counts. At the time of indictment, Peters was a candidate for Colorado Secretary of State, a position that would involve supervising the state's elections. In May 2022, a Colorado district judge prohibited Peters and Knisley from overseeing November 2022 Mesa County elections, the second year of such a prohibition.

Communities

Cities
 Fruita
 Grand Junction

Towns
 Collbran
 De Beque
 Palisade

Census-designated places
 Clifton
 Fruitvale
 Loma
 Orchard Mesa
 Redlands

Other unincorporated places
 Cameo
 Carpenter
 Gateway
 Glade Park
 Mack
 Mesa
 Molina
 Plateau City, Colorado
 Whitewater

Transportation

Road
 Interstate 70 runs from Interstate 15 in Cove Fort, Utah to Baltimore, Maryland, connecting Grand Junction to Denver, Kansas City, St. Louis, Indianapolis, and Columbus. Via Interstate 15, it connects Grand Junction with Las Vegas, Nevada, and southern California.
 U.S. Highway 6 serves 14 states, running east–west from Provincetown, Massachusetts, to Bishop, California. In Colorado, it generally runs parallel to Interstate 76 and Interstate 70.
 U.S. Highway 50 crosses 12 states, linking Ocean City, Maryland, with Sacramento, California. In Colorado, U.S. 50 connects Grand Junction with Montrose, Gunnison, and Pueblo, and to the west, it travels into the state of Utah.
 SH 340 runs east–west, starting at First Street in downtown Grand Junction, traversing the Redlands and ending at U.S. Highway 6 and U.S. Highway 50 in Fruita.

Air
Downtown Grand Junction is 4.8 miles from Grand Junction Regional Airport, 25 miles from Mack Mesa Airport, and 12.6 miles from Pinyon Airport.

Train
An Amtrak station is in downtown Grand Junction. The California Zephyr makes daily stops on its way between San Francisco and Chicago.

Bus
A regional Bustang bus stop is in Grand Junction. Grand Valley Transit serves the area's eleven fixed routes.

See also

Outline of Colorado
Index of Colorado-related articles
Colorado census statistical areas
Grand Valley AVA
Grand Junction Metropolitan Statistical Area
National Register of Historic Places listings in Mesa County, Colorado
Mesa County Public Library District

References

External links
Mesa County official website
Colorado County Evolution by Don Stanwyck
Colorado Historical Society

 

 
Colorado counties
1883 establishments in Colorado
Populated places established in 1883